The Sunday Library for Household Reading is a British series of children's religious biographies and histories. It was published by Macmillan from 1868, and edited by Frances Martin. The intended audience has been identified as families reading after church service on Sunday.

The works appeared in monthly parts at one shilling, as part publishing.

Notes

Series of books
British children's books
Christian children's books
1860s books
1870s books
Biographies (books)